Dubrovo is a rural locality (a village) in Dvurechenskoye Rural Settlement, Permsky District, Perm Krai, Russia. The population was 36 as of 2010. There are 8 streets.

Geography 
Dubrovo is located 42 km southeast of Perm (the district's administrative centre) by road. Gorny is the nearest rural locality.

References 

Rural localities in Permsky District